Plauen (Czech: Plavno) is, with around 65,000 inhabitants, the fifth-largest city of Saxony, Germany after Leipzig, Dresden, Chemnitz and Zwickau, the second-largest city of the Vogtland after Gera, as well as the largest city in the Saxon Vogtland (German: Sächsisches Vogtland). The city lies on the river White Elster (Weiße Elster; a tributary of the Saale), in the Central Vogtlandian Hill Country. Plauen is the southwesternmost city of a string of cities sitting in the densely populated foreland of the Elster and Ore Mountains, stretching from Plauen in the southwest via Zwickau, Chemnitz and Freiberg to Dresden in the northeast. It is the capital of the Vogtland District. Plauen borders Thuringia to the north, and it is also situated near the Saxon border with Bavaria (Franconia) and the Czech Republic (Bohemia).

Although being a Saxon city, the regional Vogtlandian dialect spoken in Plauen is a (Saxon-influenced) East Franconian variant related to the dialects of neighbouring Franconia in Bavaria. The name of the city as well as the names of many of its boroughs are of Slavic origin. Plauen and the surrounding Saxon Vogtland are known as the centre of the German embroidery and lace industry.

History
Plauen was founded by Polabian Slavs in the 12th century as "Plawe" and was passed to the Kingdom of Bohemia in 1327. The town was captured by the Archbishop of Magdeburg, Lippold von Bredow, in 1384. In 1466, it was passed to Albertine Saxony and later in 1569 to the Electorate of Saxony. Plauen became incorporated into the Kingdom of Saxony in 1806 during the Napoleonic Wars, and in 1871 it became part of the German Empire.

In the late-19th century, Plauen became a centre of textile manufacturing, specializing in Chemical lace, called Plauen lace. Around 1910, Plauen, as an industrial 'boomtown' of the region, reached its population peak (1910 census: 121,000, 1912: 128,000). Plauen's population, however, has shrunk dramatically since the Second World War (1939: 111,000 inhabitants).

In the 1930s, Plauen hosted the first chapter of the Nazi Party outside of Bavaria. During the war, the Nazis operated a prison in the town, and three subcamps of the Flossenbürg concentration camp. 500 women, mostly Polish, but also Russian, Italian, French, Yugoslavian and Croatian, were imprisoned and used as forced labour in the first two subcamps, and 50 men from various countries were imprisoned in the third subcamp. It was occupied by American troops on 16 April 1945 but was left to Red Army on 1 July 1945. On December 15, 1945, the city issued 7 semi-postal postage stamps of its own to raise money for reconstruction.

From 1945 onwards, Plauen fell into the Soviet occupation zone of Germany, which later became the German Democratic Republic (1949-1990). Plauen hosted a large Red Army occupation garrison and, in the last years of the GDR (DDR), an officer school of the Border Guards ("Grenztruppen der DDR"). The first mass demonstration against the communist regime in the GDR began in Plauen on 7 October 1989; this was the beginning of a series of mass demonstrations across the country and ultimately led to the re-unification of Germany in 1990.

The exposé Fast Food Nation gives special mention to Plauen as the first city of the GDR to have a McDonald's restaurant following the collapse of the Berlin Wall.

In the district reform of 1 July 2008, Plauen lost its urban district status and was merged into the district Vogtlandkreis.

Politics
The first freely elected mayor after German reunification was Rolf Magerkord of the Christian Democratic Union (CDU), who served from 1990 to 2000. The mayor was originally chosen by the city council, but since 1994 has been directly elected. Ralf Oberdorfer of the Free Democratic Party (FDP) was mayor between 2000 and 2021. The most recent mayoral election was held in two rounds on 13 June and 4 July 2021, in which Steffen Zenner (CDU) was elected.

The most recent city council election was held on 26 May 2019, and the results were as follows:

! colspan=2| Party
! Votes
! %
! +/-
! Seats
! +/-
|-
| bgcolor=| 
| align=left| Christian Democratic Union (CDU)
| 20,717
| 23.7
|  11.7
| 11
|  5
|-
| bgcolor=| 
| align=left| Alternative for Germany (AfD)
| 17,464
| 20.0
| New
| 11
| New
|-
| bgcolor=| 
| align=left| The Left (Die Linke)
| 12,728
| 14.5
|  6.9
| 6
|  3
|-
| bgcolor=| 
| align=left| Social Democratic Party (SPD)
| 12,245
| 14.0
|  5.0
| 6
|  2
|-
| bgcolor=| 
| align=left| Free Democratic Party (FDP)
| 8,687
| 9.9
|  2.6
| 4
|  1
|-
| bgcolor=| 
| align=left| Alliance 90/The Greens (Grüne)
| 7,529
| 8.6
|  2.7
| 3
|  1
|-
| 
| align=left| Initiative Plauen (WV)
| 4,752
| 5.4
|  0.4
| 2
| ±0
|-
| bgcolor=#0B6623| 
| align=left| The III. Path 
| 3,366
| 3.8
| New
| 1
| New
|-
! colspan=2| Valid votes
! 30,247
! 98.2
! 
! 
! 
|-
! colspan=2| Invalid votes
! 556
! 1.8
! 
! 
! 
|-
! colspan=2| Total
! 30,803
! 100.0
! 
! 42
! ±0
|-
! colspan=2| Electorate/voter turnout
! 52,962
! 58.2
!  13.8
! 
! 
|-
| colspan=7| Source: Wahlen in Sachsen
|}

Industry and infrastructure

Plauen (Vogtland) Oberer Bahnhof lies on the Leipzig–Hof line. The section of this line through Plauen is part of the Saxon-Franconian trunk line running between Nürnberg, Hof, Plauen, Zwickau, Chemnitz and Dresden. The city had another station, Plauen (Vogtland) Unterer station (now defunct), on the Elster Valley Railway. There is a plan to rename the Oberer (Upper) station into Plauen Hauptbahnhof (Main Station).

Vogtlandbahn (Vogtland Railway), a regional train company, operates services from Plauen to Hof, Werdau, Chemnitz, Zwickau, Falkenstein and Adorf within Germany and Cheb in the Czech Republic. At these stations, there are other Vogtlandbahn services to Munich, Regensburg, Marktredwitz, Dresden and Leipzig within Germany and Karlovy Vary and Prague in the Czech Republic. A Vogtlandbahn Express Bus service runs between Plauen and Berlin Schönefeld Airport and Zoological Garden.

The Plauen Straßenbahn is a tramway that has 6 lines connecting the centre of city, Plauen-Tunnel stop, to the surrounding areas and the Oberer railway station.

Main sights

Embroidery Machine Museum
Museum Plauener Spitze
Galerie e.O. plauen
Old City Hall
Elster Viaduct – second largest brick bridge in the world
Friedensbrücke – largest stone arch bridge in the world
Johanniskirche
Old Elster Viaduct – oldest bridge in Saxony
Malzhaus

Education and science
Plauen is home to a University of Applied Sciences with about 300 students and a DIPLOMA Fachhochschule.

Twin towns – sister cities

Plauen is twinned with:

 Aš, Czech Republic (1962)
 Steyr, Austria (1970)
 Hof, Germany (1987)
 Siegen, Germany (1990)
 Cegléd, Hungary (2005)
 Pabianice, Poland (2006)
 Šiauliai, Lithuania (2010)

The urban district of Jößnitz is twinned with Heilsbronn, Germany.

Notable people

Heinrich von Plauen (1370–1429), Grand Master of the Teutonic Knights
Christoph Pezel (1539–1604), theologian
Johann von Mayr (1716–1759), Prussian general
Ferdinand Gotthelf Hand (1786–1851), philologist
Eduard Friedrich Poeppig (1798–1868), botanist, zoologist and explorer
Gustav Hartenstein (1808–1890), philosopher
Charles Beyer (1813–1876), locomotive designer and engineer
Emil Kautzsch (1841–1910), theologian
Arwed Rossbach (1844–1902), architect in Leipzig
Hermann Vogel (1854–1921), illustrator
Kurt Helbig (1901–1975), weightlifter
Friedrich Hielscher (1902–1990), religious philosopher, writer and resistance fighter against Nazism
E.O. Plauen (1903–1944), cartoonist
Paul Wessel (1904–1967), politician (SED)
Egon Zill (1906–1974), Nazi SS commandant of the Flossenbürg concentration camp
Werner Hartenstein (1908–1943), war-time commander of U-156
Walter Ballhause (1911–1991), photographer
Horst Dohlus (1925–2007), SED functionary
Karl Richter (1926–1981), conductor, organist, and harpsichordist
Hans Otte (1926–2007), composer and pianist
Klaus Zoephel (1929–2017), composer and conductor
Klaus Zink (born 1936), footballer
Angelika Bahmann (born 1952), slalom canoeist, Olympic champion
Kornelia Ender (born 1958), swimmer, Olympic champion
Volker Eckert (1959-2007), serial killer
Matthias Freihof (born 1961), television actor and director 
Andrea Stolletz (born 1963), handball player
Olaf Schubert (born 1967), comedian and musician
Martin Dulig (born 1974), politician (SPD)
Christian Bahmann (born 1981), slalom canoeist
Christin Zenner (born 1991), swimmer
Kassem Taher Saleh (born 1993), politician (Alliance 90/The Greens)

Honorary citizens
Martin Mutschmann, 1933 (revoked 1945)

Gallery

References

External links

 

 
Vogtlandkreis
Populated places established in the 12th century